Françoise-Albine Benoist (1724 – 1808 or 1809) was a French novelist, playwright and essayist born in Lyon.

She wrote a few theater works that were never played. She was also a journalist for Le Journal des Dames.

Little is known about her life. In April 1754 she married painter and draughtsman Jean-Marie Benoist.

According to Manon Roland, Benoist may have been a model for the heroine of Charles-Albert Demoustier's Lettres à Emilie.

Her most famous work is Les Aveux d'une jolie femme.

Works
Journal en forme de lettres, mêlé de critiques et d'anecdotes, par Madame B**, 1757.
Journal des dames, February 1759, p. 80-86.
Journal des dames, April 1759, p. 37-46.
Mes principes, ou la Vertu raisonnée, par Madame B***, Amsterdam and Paris, Cuissart, 1759.
« Lettre d'une femme sincère », Journal des dames, July 1761, p. 53-66 .
« Seconde lettre d'une femme sincère », Journal des dames, September 1761, p. 212-224 .
Élisabeth, roman par Madame ***, Amsterdam, Arkstée and Merkus, 1766 (with two further editions by the same publisher in 1766).
Célianne, ou les Amans séduits par leurs vertus, par l'auteur d'« Elisabeth », Amsterdam and Paris, Lacombe, 1766 (with a further edition in Amsterdam in 1767, in Paris, aux dépens de la Compagnie in 1768; translated into italien as Celianna, ovvero, Gli amanti sedotti dalle loro virtù in Venice in 1785 ; there is a modern edition by Olga B. Cragg published in Saint-Etienne in 2002 ).
La Vertu persécutée, ou, Lettres du colonel Talbert, par Madame ***, auteur d'Elisabeth, Dresden, Walther, 1767 (with two further editions in Amsterdam and Paris in 1767 ).
Paméla françoise ou la Vertu en célibat et en mariage, dépeinte dans les lettres de Messieurs de Talbert & Mozinge, rédigées dans le goût des lettres de Clarisse & Grandisson par madame Riccoboni… Nouvelle édition, Amsterdam and The Hague, 1768.
La Supercherie réciproque, comédie en un acte et en prose, Amsterdam and Paris, Durand, 1768.
Le Triomphe de la probité, comédie en deux actes et en prose ; imitée de l'Avocat, comédie de Goldoni, Paris, Le Jay, 1768 (and included in a collection).
Agathe et Isidore, Amsterdam and Paris, Durand, 1768 (republished as Les Avantures du beau cordonnier ; ou Les amours d'Isidore, né marquis d***, et de la vertueuse Agathe veuve du marquis d'Olfonte. Tableau intéressant de la sympathie des cœurs nobles, The Hague and Frankfurt, Van Duren, 1769).
Sophronie, ou Leçon prétendue d'une mère à sa fille, London and Frankfurt, Eslinger, 1769 ; London and Paris, Veuve Duchesne, 1769.
L'Erreur des désirs, Paris, Veuve Regnard and Demonville, Lyon, Cellier, Rouen, Abraham Lucas, 1770.
Folie de la prudence humaine, Amsterdam and Paris, Veuve Regnard and Demonville, 1771.
Les Erreurs d'une jolie femme ou l'Aspasie françoise, Brussels and Paris, Veuve Duchesne, 1781  (translated into German as Die Irrtümer eines artigen Frauenzimmers oder die franzosische Apasia, Breslau, Meyer, 1782 ; translated into English as Aspasia; or, the dangers of vanity. A French story, taken from real life, London, Bew, 1791 ).
Les Aveux d'une jolie femme, Brussels and Paris, Veuve Duchesne, 1782.
Lettres sur le désir de plaire, 1786.

References

External links
 "Françoise BENOIST (1724-1789 ca)", Dictionnaire des journalistes (1600-1789) 

18th-century French women writers
18th-century French novelists
French women novelists
French women dramatists and playwrights
18th-century essayists
French women essayists
1724 births
Writers from Lyon
18th-century French dramatists and playwrights
Year of death uncertain
18th-century French journalists
French women journalists